The Matthias Smith House is a historic house at 375 Cedar Street in Barnstable, Massachusetts.  The -story Cape style wood-frame house was built c. 1760 by Matthias Smith, and was the center of a working farm for two centuries.  It is five bays wide, with a central entry and central chimney, with two single-story ells added to its left.  The entry is topped by a small transom window with two bullseye lights.  The house is a well-preserved example of a mid-18th century farmhouse; the property includes a number of agricultural outbuildings, including a barn, toolshed, and chicken houses.

The property was listed on the National Register of Historic Places in 1987.

See also
National Register of Historic Places listings in Barnstable County, Massachusetts

References

Houses in Barnstable, Massachusetts
National Register of Historic Places in Barnstable, Massachusetts
Houses on the National Register of Historic Places in Barnstable County, Massachusetts